Jerry Porter Moore (born March 16, 1949) is a former American football player who played defensive back for four seasons in the National Football League (NFL) with the Chicago Bears and New Orleans Saints.  He played college football at the University of Arkansas.

References

1949 births
Living people
Sportspeople from Belleville, Illinois
Players of American football from Illinois
American football defensive backs
Arkansas Razorbacks football players
Chicago Bears players
New Orleans Saints players
Brian Piccolo Award winners